Negombo Tamil may refer to:

Negombo Tamils, native Sri Lankan Tamils who live in the western Gampaha and Puttalam districts
Negombo Tamil dialect, a language dialect used by the fishers of Negombo, Sri Lanka